André Barde was the pseudonym of André Bourdonneau (July 1874, Meudon – October 1945, Paris), a French writer best known for his libretti for operettas. He was active from 1899-1936. He frequently collaborated with Charles Cuvillier - Son petit frère (1907), Afgar (1909), La Reine joyeuse (1912), Florabella (1921), and Nonnette (1922) being some examples. His works include Pas sur la bouche (1925; in English: "Not on the Mouth"), which has been filmed twice.

External links
 Barde at the ECMF

1874 births
1945 deaths
French musical theatre lyricists
French opera librettists
People from Meudon
French male dramatists and playwrights